is a Japanese manga series written and illustrated by Osamu Tezuka about a friendship between a samurai and a doctor in the final days of the Tokugawa Shogunate. Hidamari no Ki received the Shogakukan Manga Award in 1984 for general manga.

The story is partly based on Tezuka's great-grandfather who was one of the Japanese physicians pushing for acceptance of Western medical practice at the time. The title is a metaphor for the Tokugawa shogunate which is compared to an old camphor tree which has enjoyed the sunshine and shelter from the winds for 300 years, but is slowly dying because it is being eaten away from the inside by termites and gribbles.

It has been adapted into an anime series, by Madhouse and premiered in Japan on NTV on April 4, 2000. It also was adapted into a television drama, and also a 2021 stage play starring Sugeta Rinne of the boyband 7 MEN Samurai.

Plot
The story follows two young men whose lives intersect during the political turbulence and social upheaval in Japan in the late 1800s. Dr. Ryoan Tezuka is a medical student attracted to the radical new of Western medicine, while Manjiro Ibuya is a samurai who is a staunch supporter of honor and tradition. They both encounter and fall in love with the same woman, O-Seki, the daughter of a respected Temple priest. Ryoan's idealism is gradually eroded, and he marries, settles down and takes over his father's medical practice. Meanwhile, Manjiro rises through the ranks of samurai society and the shogun initially gives him the delicate task of managing a United States emissary and later to turn farmers into an armed infantry.

Characters

Voiced by Koichi Yamadera
Ryoan is a medical student with a gentle and inquiring nature, but also a well-known womanizer. He is the son of the doctor Ryosen Tezuka in Azabu, Edo during the Ansei era who is a proponent of integrating Western medicine into Japan. Ryoan is also attracted to the radical new Western medicine and  travels to Osaka to study with Ogata Hiroshi.

Mitsuru Miyamoto
Manjiro is a traditionalist and essentially a self-taught samurai who is inclined to be hot-headed. He initially joins the Gembukan dōjō to develop his skills, but is forced to leave after killing two of its members while defending Ryoan Tezuka. He is eventually recognized by the shogunate for evacuating displaced people of the Great Ansei earthquake and was selected as the guard of the US mission in Japan.

O-Seki is the beautiful daughter of a priest at the local Zenshouji Temple in Azabu and courted by both Ryoan Tezuka and Manjiro Ibuya.

Media

Manga
The manga was released by Shogakukan in eleven tankōbon released between July 1, 1988 and January 1, 1989. The manga was re-released as eight tankōbon, the first five on March 17, 1995 and the final three on July 17, 1995. The series was re-released in 6 kanzenbans between September 7, 1999 and January 27, 2000. The series was released in 6 widebans, the first on August 29, 2008, the second and third on September 30, 2008 and the final three on October 30, 2008.

Volume listing

Anime
The series was adapted into a 25-episode anime television series directed by Gisaburô Sugii. It was broadcast on NTV between April 4 and September 19, 2000. VAP released a series of 9 DVDs, each containing 2 or 3 episodes of the anime. They were released between June 21, 2000 and February 21, 2001.

Episode list

Soundtrack CD
On June 21, 2000, Vap released a soundtrack CD for the Hidamari no Ki anime. The songs are performed by Keiko Matsui and are composed by Kazu Matsui.

TV drama
The manga was adapted into a live-action television drama. The series' script was written by Yoichi Maekawa and was directed by Takashi Fujio. It was produced by Kazukiyo Morishita and Takahisa Goto. Its twelve episodes were broadcast on NHK between April 6, 2012 and June 22, 2012.

Cast
Hayato Ichihara as Manjiro Ibutani
Hiroki Narimiya as Ryoan Tezuka
Mei Kurokawa as Oseki
Tokuma Nishioka as Sensaburo Ibutani
Kimiko Ikegami as Otone
Takashi Sasano as Ryōsen Tezuka
Yūko Kotegawa 
Shinobu Otsuka as Otsune
Yuko Fueki 
Chihiro Otsuka as Aya
Masahiko Tsugawa as Toko Fujita

Source:

Reception
The Hidamari no Ki manga received the Shogakukan Manga Award in 1984 for general manga.

The Hidamari no Ki anime received the Excellence Prize in the animation category at the 2000 Japan Media Arts Festival.

Notes

References

External links

1981 manga
2000 anime television series debuts
Historical anime and manga
Madhouse (company)
NHK original programming
Nippon TV original programming
Osamu Tezuka anime
Osamu Tezuka manga
Seinen manga
Shogakukan manga
Winners of the Shogakukan Manga Award for general manga